The 2005 Richmond Spiders football team represented the University of Richmond during the 2005 NCAA Division I-AA football season. Richmond competed as a member of the Atlantic 10 Conference (A-10) under second-year head football coach Dave Clawson and played its home games at University of Richmond Stadium.

Richmond finished the regular season with an 8–3 overall record and 7–1 record in conference play, sharing the A-10 title with the University of New Hampshire. The Spiders were awarded an at-large berth in the I-AA playoffs. The Spiders defeated third-seeded Hampton University in the first round of the playoffs, but fell in the quarterfinals to Furman University.  The Spiders finished the season with a #8 national ranking according to The Sports Network's Division I-AA poll.

Schedule

Roster

References

Richmond
Richmond Spiders football seasons
Atlantic 10 Conference football champion seasons
Richmond Spiders football